Kambadasan (1916–1973) was an Indian writer, poet and film lyricist who worked mainly in Tamil-language films.

Early life
Kambadasan was born as Appaavu a.k.a. Rajappa at Ulagapuram, a village near Tindivanam in the then South Arcot District (Madras Presidency) on 15 September 1916. His father Subbarayar was a potter and his mother is Balammal. He was the only son to his parents whose other five children were all girls. The family migrated to Purasaivakkam in Chennai when he was a child. The school education came to an end with 6th standard.

He was interested in stage plays. With his fine voice, singing talents and ability to play the harmonium, he soon established a place for himself in stage dramas. Rajappa was devoted to poet Kambar and took his pen name as Kambadasan which means fanatic of Kambar.

Career
As a writer, he has written short stories, poems and plays.

With his talents, it was an easy entry for him into the Tamil cinema. He started as an actor and then developed into scriptwriter and lyricist. His debut as a lyricist was in Vaamana Avatharam (1940) in which he was credited as C. S. Rajappa. He wrote the dialogues for Saalivaahanan (1945)  and as a popular lyricist with the hit song Arul Thaarum Deva Mathaave in Citadel's Gnana Soundari (1948). Another song Parthal pasi theerum sung by the erstwhile P. U. Chinnappa for the film Mangayarkarasi (1949) also was a hit. He was also featured as the court poet in this film.

He was adept at writing for dubbed films. Many of the films dubbed from Hindi and Telugu were successful at the box office in Tamil mainly due to his dialogues and lyrics. The challenge for writing for dubbed films is to write lyrics with the tune already set and to suit the lip movements. A case in point for his success in such films is Vaanaratham (1956). Lata Mangeshkar who sang the original Hindi songs rendered the Tamil versions written by Kambadasan.

Family life and death
He first married Chitralekha, a dancer and daughter of Malayalam poet Vallathol. The marriage did not last long and they separated soon. Then he married poet and school teacher Susheela. That marriage also failed. He married again a dancer Anusuya.

Kambadasan was admitted to Royapettah hospital due to failing health condition related to alcoholism, and he died on 23 May 1973.

Filmography

As actor

As Script and Dialogues writer

As lyricist

References

Bibliography
, Dinamani

External links
Kambadasan songs
A list of his published works can be seen in the Tamil Wiki article Kambadasan

1916 births
1973 deaths
Tamil film poets
Indian lyricists
People from Viluppuram district